Jonathan Alexánder Pérez Lara (born January 18, 2003) is a professional footballer who plays as a winger for Major League Soccer club LA Galaxy. Born in the United States, he represented the Mexico national under-20 team.

Club career
Pérez played with the LA Galaxy academy from 2016, before signing as a homegrown player with Major League Soccer club LA Galaxy on February 21, 2020. He made his professional debut on March 8, 2020 for LA Galaxy's USL Championship side, appearing as a 56th-minute substitute in a 5–1 win over Rio Grande Valley FC.

International career
Born in the United States, Pérez is of Mexican descent. He represented the Mexico U-18 team in January 2020 in the Copa del Atlantico.

Pérez was called up to the Mexico U-20 team by Luis Ernesto Pérez to participate at the 2021 Revelations Cup, scoring one goal in three appearances, where Mexico won the competition. He was included in the under-20 side that participated in the 2022 CONCACAF U-20 Championship, in which Mexico failed to qualify for the FIFA U-20 World Cup and Olympics.

Career statistics

Club

Honours
Mexico U20
Revelations Cup: 2021

References

External links
 
USSF Development Academy bio
LA Galaxy bio

2003 births
Living people
Soccer players from California
Mexican footballers
Mexico under-20 international footballers
Mexico youth international footballers
American soccer players
United States men's youth international soccer players
American sportspeople of Mexican descent
Association football midfielders
Homegrown Players (MLS)
LA Galaxy players
LA Galaxy II players
Major League Soccer players
USL Championship players